The First 7th Night is a 2009 Hong Kong horror film directed by Herman Yau and starring Gordon Lam, Julian Cheung, Michelle Ye and Eddie Cheung. The film was rated Category III by the Hong Kong motion picture rating system.

Synopsis
A helpless Taxi driver, a mysterious delivery boy, a 30 years abandoned motel, a touching past, all stitches up to form a strange tale.

One day, a strange passenger "Pony" (Julian Cheung) hires a taxi driver "Map King" (Gordon Lam), paying him a huge sum of money to take him to an abandoned old motel, "Chun Lei Motel". This motel was mysteriously burnt 30 years ago, and has been abandoned ever since. No one knows of its existence, nor does anybody talks about it. To Pony's surprise, the taxi driver Map King actually knows how to get to the motel.

Fong (Michelle Ye), the only female character in this story, is the owner of the Chun Lei Motel. She started off her peaceful life with her only son until the day where "The 4 Thieves" visits her motel, on the seventh day after her husband's death. Mysteriously, the motel was on fire right after the meeting and everyone had gone missing after the fire incident, and the motel was abandoned for 30 years. What actually happened to the motel? What's the reason behind the fire? What strange things happened on and after the seventh day of Ah Fang's Husband's death?....

Cast

References

External links
 
 
 The First 7th Night at the Hong Kong Movie Database
 The First 7th Night at the Hong Kong Cinemagic

2009 films
Hong Kong horror films
2009 horror films
Hong Kong ghost films
2000s Cantonese-language films
Films directed by Herman Yau
Films set in Hong Kong
Films shot in Hong Kong
Hong Kong supernatural horror films
2000s Hong Kong films